Aurora Nealand is an American saxophonist, clarinetist, singer and composer. She leads her own band, Aurora Nealand and the Royal Roses.

Early life and education
Born the youngest of four children in Pacifica, California, to parents she calls "hippies", Nealand moved to New Orleans in 2004 after earning a degree in music composition from the Oberlin Conservatory of Music, where she created her own major in music composition.

While studying at Oberlin, Nealand spent eight months in New York City where she learned about Laurie Anderson, Brian Eno and Philip Glass.

Career
Nealand embarked on a cross country bicycle trip, during which she interviewed rural Americans and compiled their stories into a musical piece titled "American Dreams". The trip concluded in New Orleans, where she began playing traditional jazz, much of which she had grown up listening to in California. Nealand formed The Royal Roses in 2011 for a tribute concert to Sidney Bechet at Preservation Hall in New Orleans. Along with the Royal Roses, Nealand also performs as a member of the rockabilly band Rory Danger and the Danger Dangers and solo under the name Monocle. In 2019, Nealand, under the name "Monocle",  brought her project "KindHumanKind" to the New Orleans Contemporary Arts Center, receiving a positive review from OffBeat magazine. She frequently performs in a duo with New Orleans pianist and singer Tom McDermott.

Nealand was voted  "Best Female Performer” by the 2016 Gambit awards, and her band was named "Best Traditional Jazz Band" in the 2015 and 2017 Big Easy Awards. She was named one of Downbeat Magazine's "Rising Stars" on both soprano saxophone and clarinet in 2017, 2018, 2020.

Awards
Downbeat Magazine 2017

Rising Star - Soprano Saxophone

Rising Star - Clarinet Big Easy Awards

Best Female Performer - 2016

Big Easy Awards - Best Jazz Band - 2016

McDowell Colony Resident

1Beat Music Fellow (USA)

Discography

Aurora Nealand and the Royal Roses

Aurora Nealand/Tom McDermott

Panorama Jazz Band

References

External links 

 
 

Year of birth missing (living people)
Living people
American jazz saxophonists
Women saxophonists
21st-century American saxophonists
Women clarinetists
American jazz clarinetists
21st-century clarinetists
American women singer-songwriters
Singer-songwriters from Louisiana
American women jazz singers
American jazz singers
21st-century American women singers
21st-century American singers
People from Pacifica, California
Jazz musicians from New Orleans
Oberlin Conservatory of Music alumni